Manya Pathak (born 16 January 1985) is an Indian actress and entrepreneur. She is known for her role in Zee TV's series Dilli Darlings. She has featured as lead in more than ten music videos for various labels, including T-Series and Zee Music. She acted as lead actress in award-winning film Dvand (2021). Pathak represented India and walked the Red Carpet at 2022 Festival de Cannes. She has featured in many international magazines, walked ramps for many National and International brands. Pathak is also the brand ambassador for many designers and jewellery brands. Pathak is a trained Kuchipudi and kathak dancer. She is also a TEDx Speaker.  She is a philanthropist and stands for many causes for Girl Child and actively contributed during Covid Pandemic.

Early life 
Manya Pathak was born to Father AP Pathak and mother Manju Pathak. Manya Pathak did her schooling from Delhi Public School, R. K. Puram. She is an Engineering graduate from PESIT, Bangalore. She did her MBA from Symbiosis International University, Pune.

Personal life 
Pathak has one younger sister. She is married to Prateek Chaturvedi from Lucknow. Chturvedi has done Engineering from Army Institute of Technology Pune in Electronics and MBA from IIM Calcutta. Chturvedi has established Microbrewery industry in India. Chturvedi is the co-founder of India's first microbrewery Doolally, Delhi's first microbrewery Ministry of beer and is presently working as COO India for BrewDog India.

Corporate life and entrepreneur career 
Pathak has 10+ years of Corporate Experience in companies like L'Oréal , Microsoft, Vodafone, HP, Lenovo. She left microsoft to start her entrepreneurial journey along with her husband.She along with her husband started Delhi's first microbrewery Ministry of Beer. She is the only female entrepreneur to setup and brew craft beer in India. Pathak is also the co-owner of Clinque microbrewery and restaurant.

Acting career 
Pathak started her acting carer with the Zee TV's reality show Dilli Darlings. She has worked in numerous music videos. Manya has starred in the movie Dvand which was released on MX Player. She made her debut at Cannes red carpet in 2022.

Pathak also attended Queen Elizabeth II Platinum Jubilee Celebration in London. On this occasion Pathak expressed her gratitude.

Filmography

Television

Films

Music videos

References

External links 
 

1985 births
Living people
Actresses from New Delhi
Indian film actresses
Actresses in Hindi television
21st-century Indian actresses
Indian television actresses
Actresses in Hindi cinema